Home Is Where The Soul Is is a jazz album by pianist Kenny Drew, recorded in 1978 for Xanadu Records.

Reception
The Allmusic review by Scott Yanow states "The years overseas had not hurt the pianist in the least and he had clearly grown as an improviser. Worth searching for".

Track listing 
All compositions by Kenny Drew except as indicated
 "Work Song" (Nat Adderley) - 5:59  
 "Prelude to a Kiss" (Duke Ellington,  Irving Mills) - 7:15
 "West of Eden" (Austin Wells) - 5:18  
 "It Could Happen to You" (Jimmy Van Heusen, Johnny Burke) - 4:34
 "Only You" - 3:49 
 "Three and Four Blues" - 6:23  
 "Ending" - 6:10  
 "Yesterdays" - 5:40

Personnel 
 Kenny Drew - piano
 Leroy Vinnegar  - bass guitar
 Frank Butler - drums

References

1978 albums
Xanadu Records albums
Kenny Drew albums
Albums produced by Don Schlitten